Villatoro is a surname. Notable people with the surname include:

Alan Villatoro, Guatemalan musician
Anton Villatoro (born 1970), Guatemalan cyclist
Edwin Villatoro (born 1980), Guatemalan footballer
Marcos Villatoro (born 1962), American writer